Li You is the name of:

Emperor Muzong of Tang (795–824), Tang dynasty emperor, known as Li You before 812
Li You (general) (died 829), Tang dynasty general and military governor
Li Yu, Prince of De (died 905), Tang dynasty prince, known as Li You before 897